The Battle of Quiberon Bay (known as Bataille des Cardinaux in French) was a decisive naval engagement during the Seven Years' War. It was fought on 20 November 1759 between the Royal Navy and the French Navy in Quiberon Bay, off the coast of France near St. Nazaire. The battle was the culmination of British efforts to eliminate French naval superiority, which could have given the French the ability to carry out their planned invasion of Great Britain. A British fleet of 24 ships of the line under Sir Edward Hawke tracked down and engaged a French fleet of 21 ships of the line under Marshal de Conflans. After hard fighting, the British fleet sank or ran aground six French ships, captured one and scattered the rest, giving the Royal Navy one of its greatest victories, and ending the threat of French invasion for good.

The battle signalled the rise of the Royal Navy in becoming the world's foremost naval power, and, for the British, was part of the Annus Mirabilis of 1759.

Background

The endemic ill feeling between France and Great Britain during the 18th century turned into open warfare in 1754 and 1755. In 1756 what become known as the Seven Years' War broke out across Europe, pitching France, Austria and Russia against Britain and Prussia. France supported Austria and Russia in a land campaign against Prussia, and launched what it saw as its main effort in a maritime and colonial offensive against Britain. By the beginning of 1759 neither alliance had the advantage, in either the land or sea campaigns, and both were having serious problems financing the war. In 1759 more than 60% of French revenue went to service its debt, causing numerous shortages. The French navy in particular was overstretched and suffered from the lack of a coherent doctrine, exacerbated by the inexperience verging on incompetence of the Secretary of State for the Navy, Nicolas René Berryer, a former chief of police. Meanwhile, Britain's war effort up to early 1756 had been a failure. From the summer of 1757 it came under the control of the assertive new secretary of state for the southern department (foreign minister), William Pitt, who imposed a coordinated strategy. By early 1759 this was beginning to bear fruit.

In response to the British successes, the ministers of the French king Louis XV planned a direct invasion of Britain, which if successful would have decided the war in their favour. An army of 17,000 was collected at Vannes, in the south-east of Brittany, and nearly 100 transports were assembled near Quiberon Bay, plus several warships sailing en flute, that is with their guns stripped out to allow them to transport more soldiers. In its final form the French plan required these transports to be escorted by the French Navy.

However, at the best of times the French struggled to crew their full fleet with experienced mariners; landsmen could be used, but even a small deficiency in ship handling translated into a significant handicap in a combat situation. Three years into the war, thousands of French seamen were held as prisoners by the British; many more were engaged in speculative, and occasionally lucrative, privateering careers; and the unhealthy conditions, onerous onboard discipline and poor wages, paid late, acted as a strong disincentive to service. The transports also required at least a cadre of skilled men. By the summer of 1759 the French had 73 ships of the line, the largest warships of the time: 30 serving abroad and 43 in home waters. The ships in home waters required an aggregate complement of about 25,000 men; they were more than 9,000 short of this. The 43 French ships in home waters were split between the Atlantic port of Brest (22 ships) and the Mediterranean port of Toulon, with a small number at two ports on the Bay of Biscay: Lorient and Rochefort. The British had 40 ships of the line in home waters, and a further 15 in their Mediterranean Fleet, which was based in Gibraltar.

Brest was the obvious starting point for the expedition: it was a major port; it was well placed with regard to the prevailing winds; and departure from it minimised the sailing distance and time to the proposed landing site. However, Brest was at the end of a long and relatively infertile peninsula, which made supporting a large number of men there difficult; supplies of food had to come in by sea and were vulnerable to the British blockade. A typhoid epidemic in Brest during 1757–1758 killed over 4,000 French seamen, greatly exacerbating their shortage of experienced sailors. In addition, there was fear of a recurrence of the typhus outbreak. Therefore, the army assembled at Vannes and its transports gathered around the Gulf of Morbihan; the terrain was more fertile, the anchorage was large and sheltered, and men and supplies could readily be despatched from Bordeaux, Rochefort, Nantes, or Orléans.

In August, the French Mediterranean Fleet under Jean-François de La Clue-Sabran attempted to break out past Gibraltar into the Atlantic. The British Mediterranean Fleet under Edward Boscawen caught them and a two-day battle resulted in three French ships of the line being captured, two destroyed, and five blockaded in neutral Cádiz; two escaped the battle to reach Rochefort. The five French ships in Cadiz were blockaded by Boscawen's second-in-command, Thomas Brodrick. Five of Boscawen's victorious ships were transferred to Admiral Edward Hawke's fleet, off Brest.

Prelude

During 1759, the British, under Hawke, maintained a close blockade on the French coast in the vicinity of Brest. In that year, the French had made plans to invade England and Scotland, and had accumulated transports and troops around the Loire estuary. The defeat of the Mediterranean fleet at the Battle of Lagos in August made the invasion plans impossible, but Choiseul still contemplated a plan for Scotland, and so the fleet was ordered to escape the blockade and collect the transports assembled in the Gulf of Morbihan.

During the first week of November, a westerly gale came up and, after three days, the ships of Hawke's blockade were forced to run for Torbay on the south coast of England. Robert Duff was left behind in Quiberon Bay, with a squadron of five 'fifties' (ships of the line with 50 cannons) and nine frigates to keep an eye on the transports. In the meantime, a small squadron from the West Indies joined Conflans in Brest and, when an easterly wind came on the 14th, Conflans slipped out. She met Hawke the next day and he sailed hard for Quiberon into a SSE gale. Meanwhile,  had arrived in Quiberon Bay the night before to warn Duff and he had put his squadron to sea in the teeth of a WNW gale.

Battle

Having struggled with unfavourable winds, Conflans had slowed down on the night of the 19th in order to arrive at Quiberon at dawn. 20 miles off Belleisle he sighted seven of Duff's squadron. Once he realised that this was not the main British fleet, he gave chase. Duff split his ships to the north and south, with the French van and centre in pursuit, whilst the rearguard held off to windward to watch some strange sails appearing from the west. The French broke off the pursuit but were still scattered as Hawke's fleet came into sight.  sighted the French at 8.30  and Hawke gave the signal for line abreast.

Conflans was faced with a choice, to fight in his current disadvantageous position in high seas and a "very violent" WNW wind, or take up a defensive position in Quiberon Bay and dare Hawke to come into the labyrinth of shoals and reefs. About 9 am Hawke gave the signal for general chase along with a new signal for the first 7 ships to form a line ahead and, in spite of the weather and the dangerous waters, set full sail. By 2.30 Conflans rounded Les Cardinaux, the rocks at the end of the Quiberon peninsula that give the battle its name in French. The first shots were heard as he did so, although Sir John Bentley in Warspite claimed that they were fired without his orders. However the British were starting to overtake the rear of the French fleet even as their van and centre made it to the safety of the bay.

Kersaint attempted to come to the aid of Conflans, but Thésée performed her turn without closing her lower gunports; water rushed into the gundeck, and she capsized with only 22 survivors. Superbe also capsized, and the badly damaged Héros struck her flag to Viscount Howe before running aground on the Four Shoal during the night.

Meanwhile, the wind shifted to the NW, further confusing Conflans' half-formed line as they tangled together in the face of Hawke's daring pursuit. Conflans tried unsuccessfully to resolve the muddle, but in the end decided to put to sea again. Hawke saw an opportunity to rake Soleil Royal, but Intrépide interposed herself and took the fire. Meanwhile, Soleil Royal had fallen to leeward and was forced to run back and anchor off Croisic, away from the rest of the French fleet. By now it was about 5 pm and darkness had fallen, so Hawke made the signal to anchor.

During the night eight French ships managed to do what Soleil Royal had failed to do, to navigate through the shoals to the safety of the open sea, and escape to Rochefort. Seven ships and the frigates were in the Vilaine estuary (just off the map above, to the east), but Hawke dared not attack them in the stormy weather.  The French jettisoned their guns and gear and used the rising tide and northwesterly wind to escape over the sandbar at the bottom of the river Vilaine. One of these ships was wrecked, and the remaining six were trapped throughout 1760 by a blockading British squadron and only later managed to break out and reach Brest in 1761/1762. The badly damaged Juste was lost as she made for the Loire, 150 of her crew surviving the ordeal, and  grounded on the Four Shoal during the night.

Soleil Royal tried to escape to the safety of the batteries at Croisic, but  pursued her with the result that both were wrecked on the Four Shoal beside Heros.  On the 22nd the gale moderated, and three of Duff's ships were sent to destroy the beached ships.  Conflans set fire to Soleil Royal while the British burnt Heros, as seen in the right of Richard Wright's painting.

Aftermath
The British continued to keep a tight blockade on the French coast, which continued to starve French ports of commerce, further weakening France's economy. Hawke attempted to destroy some of the French warships trapped in the Vilaine Estuary, sending in fire ships; but these failed to accomplish the task. Hawke developed a plan for landing on the coast, seizing a peninsula, and attacking the ships from land. However, he was forced to abandon this when orders reached him from Pitt for a different approach, which was ultimately unsuccessful.

The power of the French fleet was broken, and would not recover before the war was over. Combined with admiral Edward Boscawen's victory at the Battle of Lagos the previous August, the French invasion threat was removed.  Although he had effectively put the French channel fleet out of action for the remainder of the war, Hawke was disappointed he had not secured a more comprehensive victory, asserting that had he had two more hours of daylight the whole enemy fleet would have been taken. Hawke's commission was extended and followed by a peerage in 1776.

The naval historian Nicholas Tracey described the battle as "the most dramatic sea battle in the age of sail", while the naval theorist and historian Alfred Mahan claimed that "The battle of 20 November 1759 was the Trafalgar of this war, and ... the English fleets were now free to act against the colonies of France, and later of Spain, on a grander scale than ever before." For instance, the French could not follow up their victory in the land battle of Sainte-Foy the following spring for want of reinforcements and supplies from France, and so Quiberon Bay may be regarded as the battle that determined the fate of New France and hence Canada. France experienced a credit crunch as financiers recognised that Britain could now strike at will against French trade. The French government was forced to default on its debt. The battle was one of a series of British victories in 1759 which caused the year to be known as an annus mirabilis (Latin for "year of wonders").

From this battle, and that two months earlier where, under General James Wolfe, the British captured Quebec, comes the Royal Naval toast "May our officers have the eye of a Hawke and the heart of a Wolfe".

Orders of battle

France

Order of Battle:

Britain

Order of Battle:

Namesake
HMAS Quiberon was a destroyer named in memory of the battle of Quiberon Bay. She served in the Royal Navy and then the Royal Australian Navy. Quiberon was launched in 1942 and saw operations in World War II. She was decommissioned in 1964.

Notes, citations and sources

Notes

Citations

Sources

Further reading
 
 
 
 Lloyd, Christopher. "Hearts Of Oak: The Battle of Quiberon Bay November 20th, 1759." History Today (Nov 1959) 9#11 pp744–751.
 Mackay, R.F. Admiral Hawke (Oxford 1965).
 Marcus, G. Quiberon Bay; The Campaign in Home Waters, 1759 (London, 1960).
 Padfield, Peter. Maritime Supremacy & the Opening of the Western Mind: Naval Campaigns that Shaped the Modern World (Overlook Books, 2000).
 Robson, Martin. A History of the Royal Navy: The Seven Years War (IB Tauris, 2015).
 
 Tracy, Nicholas. The Battle of Quiberon Bay, 1759: Hawke and the Defeat of the French Invasion (Casemate Publishers, 2010).
 Tunstall, Brian and Tracy, Nicholas (ed.). Naval Warfare in the Age of Sail. The Evolution of Fighting Tactics, 1650–1815 (London, 1990).

External links

 Royal Navy page on the battle

Conflicts in 1759
Military history of Brittany
Naval battles of the Seven Years' War
Military history of the Bay of Biscay
Naval battles involving Great Britain
Naval battles involving France